Also see: Sports in Evansville.

The Hoosier Nationals is a BMX National Series race that is a part of the National Bicycle League racing schedule. The Hoosier Nationals take place on the BMX course at Burdette Park in Evansville, Indiana. The National Series races are the highest level or racing in the US for BMX

References

Sports in Evansville, Indiana
Cycle races in the United States